The Virginia Open is the Virginia state open golf tournament, open to both amateur and professional golfers. It is organized by the Virginia State Golf Association and the Middle Atlantic section of the PGA of America. It has been played annually since 1924 (except for war years) at a variety of courses around the state. From 1958 to 1984, both organizations held an Open, with the one sponsored by the PGA generally known as the Virginia PGA Open. The tournament was considered a PGA Tour event in at least 1936 and 1946.

Winners

References

External links
Virginia State Golf Association
PGA of America – Middle Atlantic section
List of winners

Former PGA Tour events
Golf in Virginia
State Open golf tournaments
PGA of America sectional tournaments
Recurring sporting events established in 1924